The 1994–95 Slovak Cup was the 26th season of Slovakia's annual knock-out cup competition and the second since the independence of Slovakia. It was ended on 18 June 1995 with the Final. The winners of the competition earned a place in the qualifying round of the UEFA Cup Winners' Cup. Slovan Bratislava were the defending champions.

First round

|}
Source:

Second round

|}
Sources: ,

Quarter-finals

|}

Semi-finals

|}

Final

References

External links
profutbal.sk 
Results on RSSSF

Slovak Cup seasons
Slovak Cup
Cup